Katok Monastery (THL Katok Dorjé Den), also transliterated as Kathok or Kathog Monastery, was founded in 1159 and is one of the "Six Mother Monasteries" in Tibet of the Nyingma school of Tibetan Buddhism, built after Samye Monastery. It is located in Payul (Chinese Baiyu County), Karze Prefecture (Garze Prefecture), Sichuan, China, known as Kham.

Description
Katok Monastery is located 4,000m above sea level on the eastern flanks of a mountain range in Baiyu County, Garze, Sichuan.  The entire monastery complex is approximately 700m above the valley floor and is accessed by a dirt road containing 18 hairpin turns.  The nearest town is Horpo, 17 km to the north.

History 
Katok is a famous early Nyingma monastery which grew to include numerous branch monasteries within the Do Kham region and beyond. It is also credited as influencing the spread of the Nyingma monasteries known of as the "Six Mother Monasteries".

Padmasambhava, or Guru Rinpoche, spent 25 days visiting the site before the monastery was built, and sat on a rock with a double vajra, called Dorje Gatramo, with a "ka" syllable on top. From this the name of "Ka-tok" was formed, meaning "on top of ka". Also called Ka tok Dorje Den, the monastery was built on the rock and is one of Guru Rinpoche's 25 sacred sites in Do Kham.

Katok Monastery was founded in 1159 by a younger brother of Phagmo Drupa Dorje Gyalpo, Katok Kadampa Deshek, prophesied by Guru Rinpoche to be an emanation of Yeshe Tsogyal. He built at Derge, the historic seat of the Kingdom of Derge in Kham. The prophecy that 100,000 people would achieve rainbow body at Katok is said to have been realized.

Katok Monastery's third abbot, Jampa Bum (1179-1252), whose 26-year tenure as abbot ended in 1252, "is said to have ordained thousands of monks from across Tibet, and especially from Kham region of Minyak (mi nyag), Jang ('byang), and Gyémorong (rgyal mo rong)."

The original gompa fell into disrepair and was rebuilt on the same site in 1656 through the impetus of tertöns Düddül Dorjé (1615–72) and Rigdzin Longsal Nyingpo (1625-1682/92 or 1685–1752). After 1966, the monastery was destroyed by the Chinese while lamas were imprisoned. The monastery was rebuilt through the efforts of Moktsa Tulku after he was released from prison, and of Khenpo Ngakchung tulku.

Katok Monastery held a reputation of fine scholarship. Prior to the annexation of Tibet in 1951, Katok Monastery housed about 800 monks.

Katok was long renowned as a center specializing in the oral lineages (as opposed to terma) and as a center of monasticism, although both of these features were disrupted under Longsel Nyingpo (1625–1692).

According to The Tibetan Buddhist Resource Centre, disciples of Kenpo Munsel and Kenpo Jamyang compiled a Katok edition of the oral lineages in 120 volumes in 1999: "[T]wice the size of the Dudjom edition, it contains many rare Nyingma treatises on Mahayoga, Anuyoga, and Atiyoga that heretofore had never been seen outside of Tibet."

According to Alexander Berzin,

Anuyoga
Kathog Monastery became a bastion of the Anuyoga tradition when it became neglected by other Nyingmapa institutions. The Compendium of the Intentions Sūtra (Wylie: dgongs pa ’dus pa’i mdo) the root text of the Anuyoga tradition was instrumental in the early Kathog educational system. Nubchen Sangye Yeshe wrote a lengthy commentary on the Compendium of the Intentions Sūtra rendered in English as Armor Against Darkness (Wylie: mun pa’i go cha).

Expansion

In 2016, an expansion of the Katok Monastery to the northeast was completed.  This expansion included a new temple and assembly hall, directly adjacent to the existing monastery complex.

People from Katok Monastery 
A minor figure from Katok, the 1st Chonyi Gyatso, Chopa Lugu (17th century - mid-18th century), is remembered for his "nightly bellowing of bone-trumpet and shouting of phet" on pilgrimage, much to the irritation of the business traveler who accompanied him. Chopa Lugu became renowned as "The Chod Yogi Who Split a Cliff in China (rgya nag brag bcad gcod pa)."
 Dzongsar Khyentse Chökyi Lodrö (c.1893 – 1959) was educated at Katok.
 The 5th Nyingon Choktrul, Gyurme Kelzang Tobgyel Dorje (1937-1979) was a noted teacher in the Katok tradition.
 Jamyang Gyeltsen (1929-1999) served as a principal abbot, and was involved in rebuilding the monastery in the 1980s. He is known for his teaching, writing, and for compiling a history of the monastery.
 The 4th Kathok Getse Rinpoche Gyurme Tenpa Gyaltsen (1954-2018), holder of the Kathok Monastery lineage, was known for his mastery of Dzogchen. He was head of the Nga-gyur Kathok Azom Woesel Do-ngag Choekorling, and 7th head of the Nyingma school, from January–November 2018.

Lauded scholars seated at Katok Monastery
 Katok Tsewang Norbu (1698–1755)
 Getse Mahapandita (1761–1829)
 Katok Situ Chökyi Gyatso (1880-1923/5) 
 Khenpo Ngawang Pelzang (also known as Khenpo Ngakchung)
 Katok Situ Chökyi Nyima (1928–1962, died of starvation in Gothang Gyalgo prison camp)

See also
 List of Tibetan monasteries

References

 Rigpa Shedra (July 24, 2008). Katok Monastery.(accessed: Sunday August 17, 2008)

External links 
Katok Monastery 2007 on Flickr
Katok Monastery courtyard
Katok, Tibetan Monastery Inventory

Buddhist monasteries in Sichuan
Buddhist monasteries in Tibet
Buddhist temples in Tibet
1159 establishments in Asia
Nyingma monasteries and temples
Buddhist buildings in the Garzê Tibetan Autonomous Prefecture